Royal Centre is a tram stop of Nottingham Express Transit (NET) in the centre of the city of Nottingham. It derives its name from the adjacent Theatre Royal and the Royal Concert Hall. The stop is also close to the Cornerhouse, the Victoria Centre and the Newton Building of Nottingham Trent University, although much of the university's City Campus is closer to the Nottingham Trent University stop.

The stop is located on a section of Goldsmith's Street, between Talbot Street and Wollaton Street. The section was closed to normal traffic when the stop was installed in 2003, allowing trams to stop without blocking other road users. The tram stop has side platforms. A trailing crossover just to the north of the stop permits the termination of southbound trams in the stop, if circumstances prevent them continuing further into the city centre.

The tram stop opened on 9 March 2004, along with the rest of NET's initial system.

With the opening of NET's phase two, Royal Centre is now on the common section of the NET, where line 1, between Hucknall and Chilwell, and line 2, between Phoenix Park and Clifton, operate together. Trams on each line run at frequencies that vary between 4 and 8 trams per hour, depending on the day and time of day, combining to provide up to 16 trams per hour on the common section.

Gallery

References

External links

Royal Centre NET station information

Nottingham Express Transit stops
Railway stations in Great Britain opened in 2004